Alucita brunnea is a moth of the family Alucitidae. It is found in the Amazon basin.

References

Moths described in 1925
Alucitidae
Moths of South America